Declan Hutchings is an English professional footballer who plays as a defender for  club Shrewsbury Town.

Career
Hutchings made his senior debut for Shrewsbury Town on 30 August 2022, in a 2–1 defeat to Wolverhampton Wanderers U21 at the New Meadow.

Career statistics

References

Living people
English footballers
Association football midfielders
Shrewsbury Town F.C. players
Year of birth missing (living people)